Irvin Sol Cohen (1917 – February 14, 1955) was an American mathematician at the Massachusetts Institute of Technology who worked on local rings. He was a student of Oscar Zariski at Johns Hopkins University.

In his thesis he proved the Cohen structure theorem for complete Noetherian local rings. In 1946 he proved the unmixedness theorem for power series rings. As a result, Cohen–Macaulay rings are named after him and Francis Sowerby Macaulay.

Cohen and Abraham Seidenberg published their Cohen–Seidenberg theorems, also known as the going-up and going-down theorems. He also coauthored articles with Irving Kaplansky.  One of his doctoral students was R. Duncan Luce.

Death
Cohen died unexpectedly in 1955 one week after having visited Zariski in Cambridge, apparently from suicide. Many years later Zariski said of his death:

Publications

References

1917 births
1955 suicides
20th-century American mathematicians
Johns Hopkins University alumni
Massachusetts Institute of Technology faculty
Algebraists